Jitendra Prasad Sonal (also known as Jitendra Prasad Sonar) is a Nepalese politician. He is  parliamentary party leader for the  Loktantrik Samajwadi Party, Nepal in the Provincial Assembly of Province No. 2.

Political life 
Sonal, a resident of Bara, was elected to the 2017 provincial assembly elections from Bara 4(B) with 13118 votes. He was the Physical Infrastructure Minister for Province No. 2, Nepal till 6 June 2021. He including 3 other state ministers were expelled from Lalbabu Raut ministry on 6 June 2021 after a group of PSP-N joined government led by KP Sharma Oli and Sonal supported the same.

Controversy 
After Sonal was removed from his ministerial post, CIAA started investigation in 28 cases filed against the works done during his tenure. Previously, he had been diluted over abusing many government vehicles while as minister.

Electoral history

2017 Nepalese provincial elections

References

External links

Living people
People from Bara District
1969 births
Provincial cabinet ministers of Nepal
Members of the Provincial Assembly of Madhesh Province
Members of the 1st Nepalese Constituent Assembly
Terai Madhesh Loktantrik Party politicians
Madhesi Jana Adhikar Forum, Nepal politicians
Rastriya Janata Party Nepal politicians
People's Socialist Party, Nepal politicians
Loktantrik Samajwadi Party, Nepal politicians